Lisa C. Klein (born December 7, 1951) is an American engineer. She is a distinguished professor of engineering at Rutgers University in New Jersey. In 1977, she became the first female faculty member in the Rutgers School of Engineering. She is the director of the graduate program in the Department of Materials Science and Engineering.

Biography

Early life and education 
Klein was born in Wilmington, Delaware, on December 7, 1951. She earned a B.S. in metallurgy in 1973 and a Ph.D. in ceramics in 1976, both from the Massachusetts Institute of Technology.

Career 
Klein was the first female faculty member in the Rutgers School of Engineering (1977) and the first female faculty member elevated to the professor II rank, equivalent to distinguished professor status (1993).

Klein has been a visiting scientist at Sandia National Laboratories in Albuquerque, New Mexico; University of Grenoble, France; and Hebrew University of Jerusalem, Israel. She has been an editor of the Journal of the American Ceramic Society since 1998. From 1993 to 2010, she served as co-editor of the Journal of Sol-Gel Science and Technology.

Klein served two terms as president of the Rutgers American Association of University Professors (AAUP) chapter. In this role, Klein was credited with conducting negotiations that lead to novel methods for expanding the number of tenure track faculty at Rutgers; these methods have been cited  as potential models for faculty efforts to halt the attrition in numbers of tenure track faculty.

Research 
Klein's research focuses on the area of sol-gel science, a low-temperature process for making ceramic coatings. Her most important contribution to science has been the development of electrochromic window coatings that can be lightened or darkened through the use of a dimmer attached to a battery. This window coating is unique because it is manually controlled and can reflect the heat away, while still transmitting light in the summer or permit the solar heat in winter. This new development is more efficient than blinds, curtains, or tinted windows and can save on heating and cooling costs in the home or office.

Awards and honors 

 Distinguished New Engineer Award, Society of Women Engineers, 1984
 Fellow, American Ceramic Society, 1988
 Achievement Award, Society of Women Engineers, 1998
 Fellow, New York Academy of Sciences, 2001
 Elected member, World Academy of Ceramics, 2012
 Human Dignity Award, Rutgers University, 2015

References

External links

1951 births
21st-century American engineers
American women engineers
Rutgers University faculty
Living people
21st-century women engineers
People from Wilmington, Delaware
Massachusetts Institute of Technology alumni
American materials scientists
American women academics
21st-century American women scientists